James Solberg Henrickson (born 1940) is an American botanist born in Eau Claire, Wisconsin. He was a Professor of Biology at California State University, Los Angeles. He is currently a research fellow at the Plant Resources Center at the University of Texas at Austin.

Select publications 
 1964. Pollen morphology of Fouquieriaceae. Thesis (M.A.), Claremont Graduate School. 110 pp.
 1968  Vegetative Morphology of the Fouquieriacae. Dissertation (PhD), Claremont Graduate School 234 pp.
 1969. The Succulent Fouquierias. 7 pp.
 1973. Fouquieriacea DC. Volumen 1 of World Pollen and Spore Flora. Ed. Almqvist & Wiksell Periodical Co. 12 pp.
 Richard Stephen Felger. 1973. Microanalysis and Identification of a Basket Fragment from Sonora, Mexico. 7 pp.

Books 
 1969. Anatomy of Periderm and Cortex of Fouquieriaceae. 30 pp.
 1971. Vascular Flora of the Northeast Outer Slopes of Haleakala Crater, East Maui, Hawaii. Nº 7 of Contributions from the Nature Conservancy. Ed. Nature Conservancy. 14 pp.
 1972. A Taxonomic Revision of the Fouquieriacea. Rancho Santa Ana Botanic Garden Ed. 99 pp.
 James S. Henrickson, Richard M. Straw. 1976. A Gazetteer of the Chihuahuan Desert Region: A Supplement to the Chihuahuan Desert Flora. Ed. California State University. 271 pp.
 Robert F. Thorne, Barry A. Prigge, James Henrickson. 1981. A Flora of the Higher Ranges and the Kelso Dunes of the Eastern Mojave Desert in California. Ed. Southern California Botanists. 116 pp.
 James Henrickson, Lowell David Flyr. 1985. Systematics of Leucophyllum and Eremogeton (Scrophulariaceae). Ed. F. Mahler. 66 pp.

Recognition 
Species are named in his honor include:

 (Acanthaceae) Carlowrightia henricksonii T.F.Daniel
 (Asteraceae) Gaillardia henricksonii B.L.Turner
 (Boraginaceae) Cynoglossum henricksonii L.C.Higgins
 (Brassicaceae) Mancoa henricksonii Rollins
 (Cactaceae) Coryphantha henricksonii (Glass & R.A.Foster) Glass & R.A.Foster
 (Campanulaceae) Lobelia henricksonii M.C.Johnst.
 (Euphorbiaceae) Euphorbia henricksonii M.C.Johnst.
 (Malvaceae) Anoda henricksonii M.C.Johnst.
 (Polygonaceae) Eriogonum henricksonii Reveal
 (Ranunculaceae) Thalictrum henricksonii M.C.Johnst.
 (Rubiaceae) Chiococca henricksonii M.C.Johnst.
 (Scrophulariaceae) Penstemon henricksonii R.M.Straw

References 

 

1940 births
Living people
People from Eau Claire, Wisconsin
University of Texas at Austin faculty
21st-century American botanists
California State University, Los Angeles faculty